DL Group or DL Holdings Co., Ltd. is a conglomerate based in Seoul, South Korea. DL's major business includes chemical and construction.

See also
List of South Korean companies
Chaebol

References

External links
 

 
Chaebol
Conglomerate companies of South Korea